Theretra indistincta is a moth of the Sphingidae family. It is known from Queensland, Papua New Guinea, Indonesia and Bismarck Archipelago.

They have pink antennae. Pupation takes place in a mottled brown pupa.

Subspecies
Theretra indistincta indistincta  (Queensland, Papua New Guinea, Indonesia)
Theretra indistincta bismarcki Jordan, 1926 (Bismarck Archipelago)
Theretra indistincta manuselensis Joicey & Talbot, 1921 (Ceram)
Theretra indistincta papuensis Joicey & Talbot, 1921 (Papua New Guinea)

References

Theretra